Philip Terzian (born 1950) is an American journalist and author. Since 2018 he has been a contributing writer of The Washington Examiner. Before its closing in December 2018, he was Senior Writer at The Weekly Standard, the journal of politics and culture founded in 1995, having served as Literary Editor during 2005–17. He is the author of Architects of Power: Roosevelt, Eisenhower, and the American Century (Encounter Books 2010).

Life and career
Terzian is a native of Kensington, Maryland, the son of Louise (Anderson) Terzian, an attorney and probate court judge, and  L. A. Terzian, a microbiologist. His maternal grandfather, Cecil Whitaker Anderson, was an executive at American Stores in Philadelphia.  His paternal grandparents were Armenian immigrants. Terzian attended Montgomery County, Maryland public schools, the Sidwell Friends School in Washington, and was  graduated from Villanova University with a degree in English in 1973.  He did graduate work at Oxford University under H.C.G. Mathew, editor of the diaries of William Gladstone, and earned a diploma in theological studies at the Episcopal Theological Seminary in Virginia.

He worked as a reporter and editor at The Anniston Star in Alabama, Reuters and U.S. News & World Report. During 1974-78 he was assistant editor of The New Republic. He was associate editor of the Lexington Herald in Kentucky, assistant editor of the editorial pages of the Los Angeles Times, and during 1986–92, was editor of the editorial pages at the Providence Journal.

In 1970 he was a speechwriter for Lawrence O'Brien, then chairman of the Democratic National Committee.  He later wrote speeches (1978–79) for U.S. Secretary of State Cyrus Vance.

For two decades before joining The Weekly Standard, Terzian wrote a column syndicated by the Scripps Howard News Service, and reported from dozens of foreign countries. He has been a Pulitzer Prize finalist for Distinguished Commentary, a Pulitzer Prize juror, and has been a media fellow at the Hoover Institution at Stanford University. He has been a contributor to the Wall Street Journal, The New Criterion, Harper's, The Spectator, the Times Literary Supplement, London Sunday Telegraph, Commentary, the Sewanee Review and other publications. A former member of the American Society of Newspaper Editors, he is a member of the American Council on Germany and the Association of Literary Scholars and Critics. He is married and the father of two children and, among his avocations, is honorary whip of the Wolver Beagles of Middleburg, Virginia.

References

External links
 The Weekly Standard biography.
 Architects of Power (Encounter Books).
 

1950 births
Living people
American male journalists
American people of Armenian descent
The Weekly Standard people
Villanova University alumni
Alumni of Christ Church, Oxford
Virginia Theological Seminary alumni
People from Kensington, Maryland
People from Oakton, Virginia
Virginia Republicans
American Episcopalians
American literary editors
Journalists from Virginia
The Providence Journal people